Bélesta-en-Lauragais is a commune in the Haute-Garonne department in southwestern France.

Population

The inhabitants of the commune are known as  Bélestais and Bélestaises.

Astronomical observatory
A group of amateur astronomers formed the Association pour le Développement Amateur d’un Grand Instrument d’Observation (ADAGIO), which established the Bélesta Observatory in 1996. In 2019, the association donated the land from the Bélesta Observatory to the Société astronomique de France, with ADAGIO remaining the owner and operator of the telescopes.

See also
Communes of the Haute-Garonne department

References

Communes of Haute-Garonne